The Mitsubishi T-2 was a supersonic jet trainer aircraft used by the Japan Air Self-Defense Force. Introduced in 1975, it was the first Japanese-designed aircraft to break the sound barrier. It was the basis of the Mitsubishi F-1 military aircraft. All T-2s were retired by 2006.

Development
Post-World War II rendered Japan without a modern jet fighter for defensive purposes. Two decades after World War II had concluded, Japanese Air Self-Defense Force (JASDF) began to consider the development of a supersonic jet tentatively named "T-X."

Japan had found that the subsonic Fuji T-1 jet trainer did not adequately prepare trainee pilots for more complex and difficult handling front line Mach 2 fighters such as the Lockheed F-104J Starfighter and McDonnell Douglas F-4EJ Phantom and so, in 1964–65, began studies for a new trainer, the T-X, which it was hoped would also form the  basis for a future single-seat attack aircraft, the SF-X.

Consideration was also given to acquiring existing foreign aircraft instead of developing a new aircraft, with the United States offering the Northrop T-38 Talon, and the Anglo/French consortium SEPECAT offering the SEPECAT Jaguar as a trainer and single-seat fighter. Japan considered both aircraft carefully, and attempted to negotiate licensed production of the Jaguar, but these plans failed, possibly due to nationalism and the high royalty payments demanded by SEPECAT. In the end, Japan decided to manufacture its own design, which, produced to meet similar requirements, would closely resemble the Jaguar.

In 1967, Japanese aviation firms Fuji, Kawasaki, and Mitsubishi, each submitted proposals, and in September 1967, under lead designer Dr. Kenji Ikeda, Mitsubishi's design was selected. The official contract was issued for the development of the XT-2 was placed on 30 March 1968, with Mitsubishi as prime contractor and Fuji as Prime sub-contractor. Several other subcontracts with aerospace firms and other minor aviation manufacturers were also established.

By March 1969, the design had been finalized, and the XT-2 prototype was rolled out on 28 April 1971, and performed its maiden flight on 20 July 1971. The XT-2 was followed by three more prototypes, and became the first aircraft of Japanese design to break the sound barrier in level flight. Two of the four prototypes were armed, and the other two were not.

A total of 90 production T-2s were built, including 28 unarmed "T-2(Z)s", or "Zenkigata (early type)" and 62 armed "T-2(K)s", or "Kokigata (late type)"; some sources translate these variants as "T-2A" and "T-2B" respectively. An additional two T-2(Z)s were built but modified for the S-FX / F-1 strike fighter program. The last T-2 rolled off the assembly line in 1988.

Design
The T-2's configuration was clearly reminiscent of that of the two-seat Jaguar, with the two aircraft having the same overall configuration and some resemblance in details. In particular, the T-2 was also powered by two Rolls-Royce Turbomeca Adour turbofans, the same engine type used by the Jaguar, license-built by Ishikawajima-Harima Heavy Industries under the designation "TF40-IHI-801A".

Despite this similarity, the T-2 was not a copy of the Jaguar, and the two aircraft could be distinguished at a glance, the T-2 having a more dartlike appearance, being noticeably longer and having a distinctly shorter wingspan than the Jaguar. The T-2 also had many detail differences. For example, since the JASDF had no rough-field requirement, the T-2 had conventional single-wheeled landing gear and not the distinctive heavy duty landing gear of the Jaguar.

The T-2 was made mostly of aircraft aluminum alloys, though it featured selective use of titanium. The high-mounted wings had a leading edge sweep of 42.5° and a 9° anhedral. The wings feature noticeable "leading edge root extensions (LERX)" and full-span leading edge slats, with a "dogtooth" discontinuity on the outer edge of the span, though the dogtooth did not split the slat. There was a single ¾-span flap on the trailing edge, unlike the full-span double-slotted split flaps of the Jaguar, but the T-2 did have twin spoilers on each wing just forward of the flap for roll control instead of ailerons, another element clearly derived from the Jaguar. There was a small fence mounted inboard on the top of the wing. There were no fuel tanks in the wings.

The tail assembly was conventional, featuring slab all-moving tailplanes with an anhedral of 15°. The steep anhedral kept the tailplanes out of the engine exhaust while allowing them to remain effective through the wing wash. Like the Jaguar, there was a fixed ventral fin under each exhaust, while two hydraulically operated airbrakes are fitted just forward of each ventral fin.

Each Adour engine provided 22.75 kN (5,115 lbf) max dry thrust and 32.49 kN (7,305 lbf) afterburning thrust. The TF40-801As did not have the "part throttle reheat" feature added to Adour 102s as an engine-out safety feature, and the T-2 was never refitted with more powerful Adour engine variants, along the lines of the Adour 104 eventually refitted to British Jaguars, leaving the T-2 somewhat underpowered. The engine intakes had fixed rectangular geometry and fuselage splitter plates, plus a set of spring-loaded auxiliary inlets behind the intake lip for increased airflow in ground running. There were large service doors beneath the fuselage that provided excellent access to the engines for maintenance.

The T-2's tricycle landing gear all featured single wheels, with the nose gear retracting backward and the main gear retracting forward into the fuselage, rotating 90° to lie flat, and incorporated an antiskid control system. The nose gear was offset slightly to the right, with a small fixed vertical airfoil mounted in front of it to compensate for the extended nose gear's tendency to cause yaw. A runway arresting hook was fitted under the tail behind the engine exhausts.

Crew and safety
The crew sat in tandem, with the flight instructor sitting behind the student on a raised seat to give a good forward view. There was a windblast screen between the two cockpits. The aircrew sat under separate clamshell canopies on Weber ES-7J zero-zero (zero altitude, zero speed) ejection seats, built by Daiseru. The seats featured specially modified canopy penetrators to ensure safe ejection even if the canopy wasn't blown off. The seats also dispensed a cloud of radar-reflecting "chaff" on ejection to allow ground controllers to spot where the ejection occurred and direct search and rescue teams to the proper area.

Radar and radio system
Standard equipment for the armed T-2(K) included a Mitsubishi Electric J/AWG-11 search and ranging radar in the nose; a French Thomson-CSF heads-up display (HUD), license-built by Mitsubishi Electric; a Lear-Siegler 501OBL automatic heading and reference system (AHRS); as well as a UHF radio, an identification friend or foe (IFF) system, and a TACAN radio beacon navigation receiver system, all built in Japan.  The J/AWG-11 was basically a member of the family of radars fitted to the U.S. F-4 Phantom, being very similar to the AN/AWG-11 fitted to the British Royal Navy Phantom FG.1. The unarmed T-2(Z) lacked the radar, though apparently its avionics kit was otherwise the same as that of the T-2(K).

Operational history

The XT-2 was redesignated T-2 on 29 August 1973, entering service in 1975, with the first unit, the 21st Hikōtai becoming fully operational on 1 October 1976, with a second squadron, the 22nd Hikōtai following on 5 April 1978, allowing the North American F-86 Sabre to be phased out of the advanced training role. The "Blue Impulse" aerobatic display team of the JASDF re-equipped with the T-2 in the winter of 1981–82. T-2s were also used by a dedicated Aggressor squadron, being replaced by the McDonnell Douglas F-15 Eagle. T-2s were also used as conversion trainers for squadrons operating the Mitsubishi F-1, a development of the T-2.

The T-2 was retired by 2006, being replaced as an advanced trainer by the Kawasaki T-4 and as a conversion trainer by a two-seat version of the Mitsubishi F-2, which had replaced the F-1 in the anti-ship strike/ground attack role.

Variants
 XT-2 : Prototypes.
 T-2(Z)  : T-2 ( Zenki-gata), T-2A. Two-seat advanced jet trainer aircraft (59 delivered to the ASDF training squadron in 1975)
 T-2(K)  : T-2 ( Kouki-gata), T-2B. Two-seat armed weapons training aircraft.
 T-2 CCV (ja) : Experimental Control Configuration Vehicle testbed, built from the third T-2 produced.  Includes three canards.

Former operators

 Japan Air Self Defense Force
 21st Fighter Training Squadron (1976–2004)
 3rd Tactical Fighter Squadron (1978–2002)
 8th Tactical Fighter Squadron (1980–1997)
 Tactical Fighter Training Group (1981–1990)
 6th Tactical Fighter Squadron (1981–2006)

Specifications (T-2(K))

See also

References

Notes

Bibliography

 Lake, Jon. "Mitsubishi T-2: Supersonic Samurai". World Air Power Journal, Volume 18, Autumn/Fall 1994, pp. 136–147. . . 
 Michell, Simon (editor). Jane's Civil and Military Aircraft Upgrades 1994–95. Coulsdon, UK: Jane's Information Group, 1994. .

 Sekigawa, Eiichiro. "Mitsubishi's Sabre Successor". Air International, Vol. 18, No. 3, March 1980, pp. 117–121, 130–131. . 
 Taylor, John W.R. (editor) Jane's All the World's Aircraft 1976–77. London: Jane's Yearbooks, 1976. .

T-2, Mitsubishi
T-2
Aircraft first flown in 1971
Twinjets
High-wing aircraft